James Brogan was a Scottish footballer who played for the majority of his career at Bolton Wanderers. He played mostly as an inside-left or outside-left.

Having started his career in the amateur game with his local club Beith, he signed for Hibernian in 1883. He scored six goals on his senior debut for the club, in a 10–1 Scottish Cup win against Edina. He was then signed by Hibernian's Edinburgh derby rivals Hearts.

Brogan then moved to Bolton Wanderers from Hearts, after the Scottish club had toured Lancashire.

1888-1889
When signing for Bolton in December 1884, James Brogan became one of the first professional footballer's to play for Bolton Wanderers. James Brogan made his League debut, playing as a winger, on 8 September 1888 at Pike's Lane, then home of Bolton Wanderers, and their opponents were Derby County. Bolton Wanderers lost the match 6–3. James Brogan scored his debut League goal, scoring Bolton Wanderers third goal of the match. When James Brogan made his League debut he was approximately 23 years 70 days old; that made him, on that first day of League football, Bolton Wanderers' youngest player. Brogan played in all 22 League matches in season 1888-89 scoring 13 goals (Bolton Wanderers top scorer for the season), scoring two-League-goals-in-a-match twice. Brogan played as a winger in a midfield that achieved big (three-League-goals-or-more) wins on five separate occasions. James Brogan was one of five Bolton Wanderers players, who, in season 1888–89 played in every (22) League game. The other four, apart from Brogan, were, Kenny Davenport, John Milne, Bob Roberts and Davie Weir.

1892

When Brogan lost his place in the Bolton team in 1892, he left football and went to work in the shipyards, eventually retiring at the age of 85.

References 

1864 births
1951 deaths
Bolton Wanderers F.C. players
Association football forwards
Heart of Midlothian F.C. players
Scottish footballers
English Football League players
Hibernian F.C. players